The 2013 StuSells Oakville Tankard was held from September 5 to 8 in Oakville, Ontario as part of the 2013–14 World Curling Tour. Both the men's and women's events were held in a round robin format. The purse for the men's event was CAD$34,000, of which the winner, Brad Jacobs, received CAD$8,000, while the purse for the women's event was CAD$24,000, of which the winner, Sherry Middaugh, received CAD$5,000.

Jacobs successfully defended his title by defeating Kevin Koe with a score of 4–3, while Middaugh defeated Cathy Auld with a score of 5–4 in an extra end.

Men

Teams
The teams are listed as follows:

Round Robin Standings
Final Round Robin Standings

Playoffs
The playoffs draw is listed as follows:

Women

Teams
The teams are listed as follows:

Round Robin Standings
Final Round Robin Standings

Playoffs
The playoffs draw is listed as follows:

References

External links

2013 in Canadian curling
Oakville, Ontario
2013 in Ontario
Curling in Ontario
September 2013 sports events in Canada